"Night Deluxe" is the sixth domestic single by Japanese hip hop group Lead. It became their highest charting single at the time, peaking at No. 5 on the Oricon charts and remaining on the charts for five weeks.

The single became their first to be released as a CD+DVD combo, though the combo pack was of limited release.

Information
Night Deluxe is the sixth single by the Japanese hip-hop dance group Lead. It became their highest charted single at the time, ranking at No. 5 on the Oricon Singles Charts, and remained on the charts for five consecutive weeks. Limited editions included participation event tickets and a trading card.

Night Deluxe became the group's first single to be released as both a standard CD and a CD+DVD combination. While both editions contained the title track, the b-side "Here goes!", along with their corresponding instrumentals, the DVD harbored behind-the-scenes videos of the group. The music video for "Night Deluxe" would later be released on their second video compilation, Lead Movies 2.

The title track was written and composed by musical composer Daisuke "D.I" Imai, who had primarily worked with Avex Group artists, with the lyrics written by Shōko Fujibayashi. Daisuke has worked with famous Japanese singer-songwriter Kumi Koda and South Korean artists BoA and Tohoshinki for top-charting singles. Shoko is best known for their credits with BoA and Foxxi misQ. The coupling track, "Here goes!", was arranged by Ryuichiro Yamaki, who is best known for his remixing work under the name "R.Yamaki," and composed by JUNKOO. The lyrical portion was done by Chokkyuu Murano.

"Night Deluxe" won gold during the 46th Japan Record Awards, alongside "Mune Kogasu..." by Da Pump, "Quincy" by BoA and "Carry On" by EXILE among others.

Packaging
Night Deluxe became Lead's first single to be released as both a standard CD and a CD+DVD combo. The CD+DVD was of limited edition, while the CD is still available. Both editions held the same material on the CD: the title track, the b-side "Here goes!", and their corresponding instrumentals.

However, instead of carrying the music video to "Night Deluxe," the DVD contained off-shots of the group during filming of their videos, along with interviews focusing on each member.

Track listing

Charts

References

External links
Lead Official Site

2004 singles
2004 songs
Lead (band) songs
Pony Canyon singles